San Felasco Hammock Preserve State Park is a Florida State Park in Alachua County, Florida. It is located northwest of Gainesville, Florida on CR 232 (Millhopper Road), just south of the town of Alachua.

Fauna
Among the wildlife of the park are feral pigs, bobcats, white-tailed deer, gray foxes, wild turkeys, and many species of songbirds.

Flora
Many species of hardwood trees, the sandhill, hydric hammock and swamp plant communities, including rare plants.

History
The park includes 56 archaeological sites, representing various eras from the Paleo-Indian period (10,000 to 12,000 years ago) up to the 20th century. The site of the Spanish-era Mission San Francisco de Potano, on the U.S. National Register of Historic Places, is in the park. ("San Felasco" derives from the Seminole pronunciation of "San Francisco".) Four of the archaeological sites in the park are possibly associated with those land grants, and/or with the settlement of Spring Grove, which existed in the 1830s and 1840s. The Battle of San Felasco Hammock, part of the Second Seminole War, was fought in the hammock in 1836, but the site of the battle has not been identified. Sites in the park from the 20th century include remains of moonshine stills, a dairy farm, tung oil operations, and a commune.

Recreational activities
Activities include hiking, biking, horseback riding, and nature viewing.

Amenities include  of single-track bike, horse, and nature trails.

Hours
Florida state parks are open between 8 a.m. and sundown every day of the year.

See also
Florida State Parks in Alachua County
Mission San Francisco de Potano

References

External links

 San Felasco Hammock Preserve State Park at Florida State Parks
 San Felasco Hammock State Preserve at Absolutely Florida
 San Felasco Hammock State Preserve at Wildernet

Parks in Alachua County, Florida
State parks of Florida
National Natural Landmarks in Florida